John Uri Lloyd House is a registered historic building in Cincinnati, Ohio, listed in the National Register on March 7, 1973. Lloyd was an American pharmacist who was a leader in the eclectic medicine movement and influential in the development of pharmacognosy, ethnobotany, economic botany, and herbalism.  In 1886, he and his two brothers, also chemists, established a pharmacology business together, named Lloyd Brothers, Pharmacists, Inc.  It operated until after the senior Lloyd's death, when it was bought in 1938 by S.B. Penick.

From their earnings, in 1919 the brothers established a trust fund for the Lloyd Library and Museum, originally based on John Lloyd's personal collection related to medical botany, eclectic medicine and pharmacy. It is also located in Cincinnati.

Historic uses 
Single Dwelling

Notes 

National Register of Historic Places in Cincinnati
Houses in Cincinnati
Houses on the National Register of Historic Places in Ohio
Eclectic medicine